The term "finest hour" originated in the 1940 speech This was their finest hour by Winston Churchill.

Finest hour may also refer to:

Books
 The Finest Hours: The True Story of a Heroic Sea Rescue, a book by Michael J. Tougias which was adapted for the namesake 2016 film
 Their Finest Hour, the second volume of Sir Winston Churchill's history of World War II

Music
 Finest Hour (album), a 2011 album by comedian Patton Oswalt
 Finest Hour (band), an American hardcore punk band
 Finest Hour (quartet), a barbershop quartet
 "Finest Hour", a song by the power metal band Borealis from the album Fall from Grace
 "Finest Hour", a 2018 song by the electronic group Cash Cash featuring Abir

Films
 The Finest Hours (1964 film), a 1964 documentary based on the above speech
 The Finest Hour, a 1991 war-drama film
 The Finest Hours (2016 film), a 2016 American film directed by Craig Gillespie

Games
 Call of Duty: Finest Hour, first-person shooter for the Xbox, PlayStation 2 and GameCube by Spark Unlimited
 Finest Hour (arcade game), Japan-only 1989 arcade game by Namco
 Hearts of Iron III: Their Finest Hour, an expansion pack for Hearts of Iron III
 Their Finest Hour (video game), air combat video game by Lucasfilm Games
 Their Finest Hour, a 1976 board wargame in the Europa series